Eriksberg is a suburb of Botkyra in Botkyrka Municipality, Stockholm County, southeastern Sweden. It contains an industrial estate and residential area of around 3,200 people, mainly residing in high-rise buildings which were built in the mid-1970s, and lower buildings erected in the 1980s. The proportion of people with a foreign background as of 2003 was 34.8%.

References

Populated places in Botkyrka Municipality
Södermanland